Saw Yan Naung (1323/24−1377/78) was governor of Prome (Pyay) from  1344 to 1375 and viceroy of Prome from 1375 to 1377/78. Descended from Pagan and Pinya royalty, Saw Yan Naung was first appointed to the governorship by King Kyawswa I of Pinya. From 1367 onwards, the governor helped his brother King Swa Saw Ke of Ava consolidate the former southern vassals states of Pinya into Ava's fold.

Early life
Saw Yan Naung was born to Shin Myat Hla and Gov. Min Shin Saw of Thayet,  1323/24. He was a grandson of King Kyawswa of Pagan and a grandnephew of King Thihathu of Pinya. Second of six siblings, Yan Naung had an elder brother Shwe Nan Shin, a younger brother Swa Saw Ke and three younger sisters, Saw Pale, Saw Myat and Saw Omma.

Yan Naung grew up in Thayet but spent his formative years in Launggyet, the capital of Arakan, the kingdom to the west of Thayet. In early January 1334, the Arakanese raided Thayet, and sent the entire family of the governor to Launggyet on 7 January 1334. The family was treated well at the Arakanese court where the children were educated by one of the most learned Arakanese monks of the day. In 1343/44, the family was allowed to leave Launggyet. Soon after their return, Kyawswa I came to power in 1344, and appointed Yan Naung governor of Prome (Pyay), a strategically important region on the Irrawaddy.

Ruler of Prome
Yan Naung ruled Prome for the next three decades. Prome and its neighbor to the east Toungoo (Taungoo), the two southernmost vassal states of Pinya, practically became independent in the late 1350s when the central authority waned precipitously. Yan Naung never formally declared independence; he did not follow suit when Toungoo formally broke away in 1358/59. But he ruled like a sovereign. He apparently never supplied his share of manpower to Pinya in the latter's war effort against the Maw Shan raids either.

For the next decade, he practically stayed out of the endemic warfare in Upper Burma. He did not submit to Thado Minbya of Sagaing, who took over Pinya in 1364 and founded the Ava Kingdom in 1365 but did not provoke him either. Yan Naung stood by as Thado Minbya attacked Toungoo, Taungdwin and Sagu, the vassal states to the east and north of Prome in 1365–67. He finally decided to join Ava in 1367–68 after his brother Swa Saw Ke had ascended to the Ava throne.

Yan Naung's support helped Swa secure the allegiance of Sagu and Toungoo. However, Toungoo's allegiance was nominal. In the 1370s, Viceroy Pyanchi I of Toungoo forged an alliance with the southern Hanthawaddy Kingdom. At Ava (Inwa), Swa was not yet willing to go to war with Hanthawaddy over Toungoo. Instead, the king sought to eliminate Pyanchi in some other way, and enlisted Yan Naung in the plot. In 1375, Yan Naung proposed a marriage of state between his daughter and Pyanchi's son, with the marriage ceremony to be held in Prome. Pyanchi understood the proposal of marriage to be the first step toward joint rebellion against Ava, and came to Prome with a small battalion. But Yan Naung's troops ambushed the Toungoo battalion near Prome, and killed Pyanchi. The ambush was not a complete success. Pyanchi's son Pyanchi II and his son-in-law Sokkate escaped, and Toungoo would remain a nominal vassal until 1383/84. Nonetheless, Swa was pleased with the ambush, which avoided an outright rebellion, and upgraded his brother's status to viceroy.

The viceroy died soon after in 1377/78. He was succeeded by his nephew Myet-Hna Shay as governor.

Ancestry

Notes

References

Bibliography
 
 
 
 
 
 
 
 

Pinya dynasty
Ava dynasty